Isaac Riley was a Canadian politician.

Isaac Riley may also refer to:

Isaac Woodbridge Riley, academic
Isaac Riley, character in B.F.'s Daughter